Andrew McGeachen (born 1882) was a Scottish professional footballer who played as an inside forward.

Career
McGeachen began his senior career with Hibernian, playing for the Leith club between 1901 and 1904. He scored the only goal of the 1902 Scottish Cup Final, quickly followed by the Glasgow Merchants Charity Cup (defeating Celtic in both matches) and played in ten matches of the following 1902–03 Scottish Division One campaign as Hibs won the championship for the first time. 

He joined Bradford City in November 1904, making 34 league appearances for the club, scoring nine goals; he also scored once in three FA Cup games. He left Bradford in September 1906 to join Clyde.

Sources

References

1882 births
Date of death missing
Scottish footballers
Cambuslang Hibernian F.C. players
Hibernian F.C. players
Bradford City A.F.C. players
Clyde F.C. players
Greenock Morton F.C. players
Scottish Junior Football Association players
Scottish Football League players
English Football League players
Association football inside forwards